The Beijing–Hankou or Jinghan railway, also Peking–Hankow railway, was the former name of the railway in China from Beijing to Hankou, on the northern bank of the Yangtze River.  The railway was built between 1897 and 1906 by a Belgian company backed by French financing.  At Hankou, railway carriages were ferried across the Yangtze River to Wuchang on the southern bank, where they would connect to the Guangdong–Hankou railway.  The completion of the Wuhan Yangtze River Bridge in 1957 linked the two railways into a single contiguous railway known as the Beijing–Guangzhou railway.

From 1928 to 1945, when Beijing was known as Beiping, the Beijing–Hankou railway was known as the Beiping–Hankou or Pinghan railway.  During the Second Sino-Japanese War, the Japanese advance into central China was known as the Beiping–Hankou Railway Operation.

History 

In 1896, the Imperial Chinese Railway Administration was established to oversee railway construction in China.  Sheng Xuanhuai attempted to balance the foreign powers by awarding concessions to different countries.  In 1897, a Belgian consortium agreed to lend £4.5 million sterling for the construction of a railway between Beijing and Hankou.  The connecting Guangdong–Hankou railway was awarded to the American China Development Company in 1898.

Starting in March 1899, the work progressed from both ends.
The Boxer Rebellion halted construction for several months in 1900.
All the railway officials were given arms to protect themselves.
In the northern stretch from Lugouqiao to Fengtai all the workshops, warehouses and wagons were destroyed and the sleepers were taken.
Work continued in the south, where the viceroys ensured protection for the Europeans.

In 1901 the line was extended through the section between Xinyang and Hankou in the hilly land between the Yellow and Yangtze rivers.
Only one  tunnel was needed.
In January 1902 the Imperial Court travelled along a completed section of the line on their way back to Beijing.
In June 1905 the  bridge over the Yellow River was open to traffic.
The  line with 125 stations was opened on 14 November 1905.
It was recognized as a major (and profitable) achievement, and the responsible engineer Jean Jadot gained great credit.

The Beijing–Hankou railway was completed in 1906.  In the meantime, the Belgians had purchased a controlling stake in the American company that held the concession for the Guangdong–Hankou railway. Most of the shares in the Belgian company were owned by Édouard Empain, and this move threatened to place the entire route between Beijing and Guangzhou under foreign control. Opposition to this state of affairs was especially strong in Hunan.

In 1907, Liang Shiyi proposed the formation of a Bank of Communications to redeem the Beijing–Hankou railway from its Belgian owners.  The Bank of Communications was formed in 1908 and provided more than half of the financing needed to buy the railway, the remaining coming from the Imperial Bank of China and the Ministry of Finance.  The railway was placed under Chinese control on January 1, 1909, and the successful redemption enhanced the prestige of Liang's Communications Clique.

Railway workers' strike
The Beijing–Hankou railway workers' strike of 1923, also known as the February 7th strike, was an important event involving this railway. By the end of 1922, 16 workers' unions had been established on the Jing-Han Railway. A ceremony to establish the Federation of Workers' Unions of the Beijing–Hankou Railway was held on February 1, 1923. However, warlord Wu Peifu sent his military police to sabotage the meeting. The Federation protested, and decided on a major strike on February 4, 1923, and relocated its office to Jiang'an, in the city of Hankou. The strike took place on February 7. Wu Peifu sent his troops to besiege the Workers' Union of Jiang'an. The chief of the Jiang'an Workers' Union (Lin Xiangqian) was arrested, and subsequently executed. Workers' movements in Changxindian, Zhengzhou, Baoding, and Gaobeidian were also put down. Union members wore badges at the strike – these were inscribed 江岸京漢鐵路工會會員證勞工神聖 (Member's badge of the Jiang'an Jing-Han Railway Union. Labour is sacred).

References

See also
Rail transport in the People's Republic of China
List of railways in China
Beiping–Hankou Railway Operation (battle along railway line)

Railway lines in China
Rail transport in Beijing
Rail transport in Hebei
Rail transport in Hubei
Railway lines opened in 1905
1905 establishments in China
Belgium–China relations